The 1990 Australian Touring Car season was the 31st year of touring car racing in Australia since the first runnings of the Australian Touring Car Championship and the fore-runner of the present day Bathurst 1000, the Armstrong 500.

There were 12 touring car race meetings held during 1990; an eight-round series, the 1990 Australian Touring Car Championship (ATCC); a support programme event at the 1990 Australian Grand Prix and a three-round series of long-distance races, nicknamed 'enduros', which counted towards both the 1990 Australian Endurance Championship and the 1990 Australian Manufacturers' Championship.

Season review
After two years domination by Dick Johnson Racings Ford Sierras, 1990 was to prove much of an upset year with race victories spread across seven teams with Nissan and Holden teams taking wins off the massed privateer Ford teams. The arrival of the 4WD, twin turbo Nissan Skyline GT-R towards the end of the Australian Touring Car Championship was enough for Jim Richards to take Nissan's first title in a four driver showdown again Ford Sierra threesome, Dick Johnson, Peter Brock and the surprising Colin Bond who had won the Lakeside and Mallala rounds of the ATCC. Glenn Seton took his first race wins as a team owner beginning with the Sandown 500, while the Holden Racing Team took a memorable Bathurst win for Win Percy and Allan Grice outlasting the GT-R and the pack of tyre frying Sierras on a day of attrition. Larry Perkins underlined Holden's return to form by winning Eastern Creek Raceways first major touring car race at the end of the season.

Results and standings

Race calendar
The 1990 Australian touring car season consisted of 12 events.

Australian Touring Car Championship

Australian Endurance Championship

Sandown 500

Tooheys 1000

Nissan Sydney 500

Australian Manufacturers' Championship

Ansett Air Freight Challenge 
The Ansett Air Freight Challenge was a support event at the 1990 Australian Grand Prix meeting. Nissan Motorsport Australia had intended to run two of the new 4WD, twin-turbo Nissan Skyline R32 GT-R's at the meeting, but were reduced to just one car after Mark Skaife rolled his GT-R at Brewery Bend (turn 10) during practice.

References

Linked articles contain additional references.

External links
 Official V8 Supercar site

Australian Touring Car Championship
Touring Cars